The Minne Lusa Theater building is located at 6714 North 30th Street in North Omaha, Nebraska. It was a one-screen neighborhood movie house that opened in the mid-1930s that seated approximately 400 patrons. The theater closed sometime in the mid-1950s. Today the building houses Heartland Family Services.

References 

Landmarks in North Omaha, Nebraska
Cinemas and movie theaters in Omaha, Nebraska
1930s establishments in Nebraska
1950s disestablishments in Nebraska